The list of ship launches in 1786 includes a chronological list of some ships launched in 1786.


References

1786
Ship launches